Generalissimus Suvorov (Russian: РПКСН Генералиссимус Суворов) is a  (Project 955A) nuclear-powered ballistic missile submarine developed by the Rubin Design Bureau and constructed by the Sevmash for the Russian Navy. The submarine is named after Alexander Suvorov.

Construction and career 
The submarine was laid down on 26 December 2014. At the end of 2015, the hull of the submarine was finished. It was taken out of the workshop on 25 December 2021 and launched on 11 January 2022. She started sea trials on 20 July 2022.

On 25 October 2022, the first photo of Generalissimus Suvorov on trials was published.

On 1 November 2022, she was being prepared for commissioning and on November 3 launched a Bulava ballistic missile from a submerged position during trials in the White Sea. The missile successfully hit a target at the Kura range on the Kamchatka Peninsula. On 7 November, all trials were finished and she was being prepared for commissioning.

She was commissioned on 29 December 2022. As of early 2023, the submarine was reported operating out of Severomorsk in the Northern Fleet operational area where her crew was continuing training. Upon completion of the training, she was to projected to transfer to the Pacific Fleet.

Her commander is Captain 1st rank Viktor Artyomov.

References 

Borei-class submarines
Ships built by Sevmash
2022 ships